Arnold Cantwell Smith  (January 18, 1915 – February 7, 1994) was a Canadian diplomat. He was the first Commonwealth Secretary-General, serving from 1965–1975.

A talented student, he won a Rhodes Scholarship to Christ Church, Oxford.

From 1958 to 1961, he was the Canadian Ambassador to Egypt. From 1961 to 1963, he was the Canadian Ambassador to the USSR.  During his time at the Commonwealth Secretariat, the Commonwealth flag was designed on his and Prime Minister Pierre Trudeau's initiative.

In 1975 he was made a member of the Order of the Companions of Honour. In 1984, he was made an Officer of the Order of Canada for "a long and distinguished diplomatic career".

Arnold Smith was the elder brother of Wilfred Cantwell Smith.

His published work includes Stitches In Time; the Commonwealth in World Politics.

References

External links
 Arnold Cantwell Smith at The Canadian Encyclopedia

1915 births
1994 deaths
Canadian Rhodes Scholars
Commonwealth Secretaries-General
Members of the Order of the Companions of Honour
Officers of the Order of Canada
Upper Canada College alumni
Ambassadors of Canada to the Soviet Union
Ambassadors of Canada to Egypt